ClockworkMod is a software company, owned by Koushik "Koush" Dutta, which develops various software products for Android smartphones and tablets. The company is primarily known for its custom recovery image, ClockworkMod Recovery, which is used in many custom ROMs.

ClockworkMod Recovery 
ClockworkMod Recovery is an Android custom recovery image. Once installed, this recovery image replaces the Android device's stock recovery image. Using this recovery image, various system-level operations can be performed. For example, one can create and restore partition backups, root, install, and upgrade custom ROMs.

ClockworkMod Recovery is free and open-source software, released under the terms of the Apache License 2.0 software license. CyanogenMod Recovery is a fork of ClockworkMod Recovery.

Compared to other recoveries 
 Unlike TWRP, but like the stock recovery, CWM Recovery uses volume buttons to navigate menus.
 Like the stock recovery, CWM can receive over-the-air updates for ROMs designed for their respective recoveries.
 Signature verification is not enforced on CWM Recovery, allowing the installation of Custom ROMs.
 CWM Recovery adds Nandroid backup support. This feature may not be present on CWM Recovery forks or successors.

Other software 
The company also provides the following apps:

 ROM Manager: An app for installing custom operating systems, known as ROMs. It was briefly pulled for violating Google Play's in-app-purchase policies.
 Tether: An app used for tethering regardless of carrier restrictions.
 Helium: An app used to backup user and system data to a phone without the need for root.
 DeskSMS: An app for sending and receiving text messages from an email, browser, or instant messenger client.
 AllCast: An app that enables streaming of local and cloud videos to Chromecast, AppleTV, FireTV, and DLNA devices.
 Vysor: An app that allows mirroring and control of an Android device through a desktop computer. It was temporarily removed due to licensing issues.

See also 
 TWRP – an alternative to ClockworkMod Recovery

Notes

References

External links 
 

Android (operating system) software
Software companies of the United States